The Intern is a 2015 American buddy comedy-drama film directed, written, and produced by Nancy Meyers. The film stars Robert De Niro, Anne Hathaway, and Rene Russo, with supporting performances from Anders Holm, Andrew Rannells, Adam DeVine, and Zack Pearlman. The plot follows a 70-year-old widower who becomes a senior intern at an online fashion website, where he forms an unlikely friendship with the company's workaholic CEO. The film was released on September 25, 2015, by Warner Bros. It received mixed reviews from critics but was a box office success, grossing $195 million worldwide against a $35 million production budget.

Plot
Seventy-year-old widower Ben Whittaker, a retired executive from DEX One, applies to fill the newly conceived position of senior intern, after retirement has become too boring for him. He applies to About The Fit, a fast-growing e-commerce fashion startup in Brooklyn. Founder and CEO Jules Ostin had previously agreed to a community outreach program where seniors would intern at the firm. Ben impresses everyone and is one of four hired.

Ben is assigned to work with Jules, who is somewhat skeptical at first. Initially frozen out by her, Ben slowly wins over co-workers with his congeniality and gets into Jules's good graces. He also helps numerous employees with their tasks. Ben comes to work at 7:00 A.M. one day to organize a messy desk that Jules had complained about previously. After work, Ben notices Jules's chauffeur drinking, convinces the driver to leave and drives Jules home himself, a role he retains in days to come. On their first drive together, Ben asks several questions about Jules' personal life, and she asks one of her employees to transfer Ben to be an intern for someone else. But by the end of the day, they become very close. The next day, Jules arrives to the car to see Ben has been replaced as her driver by Doris. Doris is a horrible driver, driving into someone else's car and almost crashing into a building. Jules drives to About The Fit and begs Ben to come back, and so he does as she has no license.

Ben eventually reveals that he once worked in the very same building where About The Fit is now based. He develops a romantic relationship with the in-house massage therapist, Fiona, and becomes something of a father figure to several of the younger workers: by offering advice about issues such as love, clothes sense and work/life balance. He provides one of them with a place to stay at his brownstone after being evicted by his parents. Ben becomes very committed to Jules, and even breaks into the house of Jules' mother to delete an embarrassingly scathing email, narrowly avoiding getting arrested in the process. Ben also gets to know Jules' family. Her husband, Matt, gave up his own career to be a stay-at-home dad to their daughter, Paige, when About The Fit started to take off. However, their marriage is slowly breaking apart as the couple grows more distant.

Meanwhile, Jules is under pressure to give up her post of CEO to someone outside of the company as her investors feel that she is unable to cope with the workload, having grown About The Fit from a startup founded in her kitchen to a 220-employee juggernaut in only eighteen months. Believing it will give her more time at home with her family, Jules is willing to consider the proposal. When driving Paige home from a party, Ben discovers that Matt is having an affair with another parent at Paige's school. While on a business trip in San Francisco to interview a potential CEO candidate, Jules reveals that she knows about Matt's cheating, but did not confront Matt about it because she was not ready to deal with it.

In an effort to buy herself time to save her marriage, Jules decides to hire a prospective CEO. When Jules goes to Ben's home the next day, Ben greatly encourages Jules to think about how much this will change her authority and how her creativity may be hindered and also reminds her of her passion for her company. Matt unexpectedly drops in at the office and urges her to reconsider, saying that he is sorry, ashamed, and wants to support her in her dreams. Jules goes out looking for Ben, wanting to tell him that she has changed her mind and finds him enjoying his tai chi exercise group. She finally lets herself relax and joins him in practicing tai chi, an act symbolic of her finding balance in her life.

Cast

Production
Originally set up at Paramount Pictures, The Intern was planned to feature Tina Fey and Michael Caine in the lead roles. Handed over to Warner Bros., Fey was replaced by Reese Witherspoon as the attached star, though Witherspoon left the film on January 15, 2014, due to scheduling conflicts. On February 7, 2014, Anne Hathaway was in final talks to replace Witherspoon in the lead role. Stephen Goldblatt was set as director of photography. On June 23, 2014, Zack Pearlman joined the cast of the film.

Filming
Principal photography began on June 23, 2014, in Brooklyn, New York City, where De Niro was spotted on the set of the film. On October 2, 2014, director Nancy Meyers announced that filming was completed.

Reception

Box office
The Intern grossed $75.7 million in North America and $118.8 million in other territories for a worldwide total of $194.6 million, against a net production budget of $35 million.

The film opened alongside Hotel Transylvania 2 and was projected to gross $15–20 million in its opening weekend. It grossed $17.7 million, finishing second at the box office behind Hotel Transylvania 2 ($48.5 million).

Critical response
 

Richard Roeper of the Chicago Sun-Times gave the film three and a half out of four stars, stating, "With some genuinely insightful dialogue, a number of truly funny bits of physical business, and small scenes allowing us to get know and like a half-dozen supporting players,"

Manohla Dargis of The New York Times wrote that the film was similar to Meyers's other works, stating that it was "frothy, playful, homogeneous, routinely maddening and generally pretty irresistible." Despite criticizing Meyers's screenplay and "conflicted ideas about powerful women," Dargis praised the casting of De Niro, stating he "owns the movie from the moment he opens his mouth." Hathaway's role was derided as "less of a character and more of a fast-walking, speed-talking collection of gender grievances." 

Clem Bastow, writing for The Guardian, suggested that poor reviews for the film were primarily coming from men, who form the overwhelming majority of film critics. Bastow further suggested that female critics would "feel the need to go hard on certain films for women" such as The Intern.

Director Quentin Tarantino viewed the film as Oscar-worthy, stating:

Accolades

Remake 
Bollywood actress Deepika Padukone announced on January 27, 2020, that she will produce the Hindi remake of The Intern, also playing the female lead role, but the remake's production was postponed mainly due to the COVID-19 pandemic. Rishi Kapoor was initially cast as the male lead, but after his sudden death in April 2020 due to leukemia, he was replaced by Amitabh Bachchan in March 2021. Principal photography began in November 2021. It is set to be released in the summer of 2022.

On July 5, 2022, the first episode of the Japanese television remake of The Intern, called Unicorn ni Notte or Riding a Unicorn, released its first episode with Hidetoshi Nishijima in the De Niro role and Mei Nagano in the Hathaway role.

References

External links

 
 

2015 films
2015 comedy films
2010s buddy comedy-drama films
2010s business films
2010s English-language films
Adultery in films
American buddy comedy-drama films
American business films
Dune Entertainment films
Films about businesspeople
Films about families
Films about old age
Films directed by Nancy Meyers
Films scored by Theodore Shapiro
Films set in Brooklyn
Films set in offices
Films set in San Francisco
Films shot in New York City
Films with screenplays by Nancy Meyers
Tai chi films
Warner Bros. films
Workplace comedy films
2010s American films